The lower circumference of the lesser pelvis is very irregular; the space enclosed by it is named the inferior aperture or pelvic outlet. It is an important component of pelvimetry.

Boundaries
It has the following boundaries:
 anteriorly: the pubic arch
 laterally: the ischial tuberosities
 posterolaterally: the inferior margin of the sacrotuberous ligament
 posteriorly: the anterior border of the middle of the coccyx.

Notches
These eminences are separated by three notches: 
 one in front, the pubic arch, formed by the convergence of the inferior rami of the ischium and pubis on either side. 
 The other notches, one on either side, are formed by the sacrum and coccyx behind, the ischium in front, and the ilium above; they are called the sciatic notches; in the natural state they are converted into foramina by the sacrotuberous and sacrospinous ligaments.

In situ
When the ligaments are in situ, the inferior aperture of the pelvis is lozenge-shaped, bounded as follows:
 in front, by the pubic arcuate ligament and the inferior rami of the pubes and ischia
 laterally, by the ischial tuberosities
 behind, by the sacrotuberous ligaments and the tip of the coccyx.

See also
 Pelvic inlet

Additional images

References

External links
 

Pelvis